Iset or Aset is an Ancient Egyptian name, meaning "(She) of the throne". It was the name of the goddess better known by her Greek name Isis. For its etymology see Isis – Etymology.

Its notable bearers were:

 Iset, mother of Thutmose III
 Iset, a daughter of Thutmose III and Hatshepsut-Meryetre, shown on the statue of her maternal grandmother Huy
 Iset, daughter of Amenhotep III and Tiye
 Iset Ta-Hemdjert, wife of Ramesses III
 Iset, God's Wife of Amun
 Iset, a river in Russia

References

Theophoric names